Gond may refer to:

 Gondi people of central India
 Gondi language, the language of the Gondi people
 Gond (raga), a musical composition in the Sikh tradition
 Gond (Forgotten Realms), a fictional deity in the Forgotten Realms campaign setting of the Dungeons & Dragons role-playing game.
 Gonds, a race in The Krotons, a serial in the television series Doctor Who

Language and nationality disambiguation pages